Louis-Étienne Parent (21 August 1875 – 24 May 1960) was a Liberal party member of the House of Commons of Canada. He was born in Grenville, Quebec and became an industrialist and lumber merchant.

Parent attended Plateau Academy in Montreal and was also privately educated.

Parent was mayor of Sainte-Agathe-des-Monts, Quebec from 1906 to 1931. In 1929, he was also President of the Lumber Merchants Association of Quebec.

He was first elected to Parliament at the Terrebonne riding in the 1930 general election then re-elected in 1935. He was defeated in the 1940 election by Lionel Bertrand, an independent Liberal candidate.

Electoral record

References

External links
 

1875 births
1960 deaths
Liberal Party of Canada MPs
Mayors of places in Quebec
Members of the House of Commons of Canada from Quebec
People from Laurentides
French Quebecers